Fasedienol (developmental code names PH94B and Aloradine), also known as 4-androstadienol or as 4,16-androstadien-3β-ol, is a pherine which is under development by VistaGen Therapeutics in a nasal spray formulation (PRN) for the acute treatment of social anxiety disorder. It is also being investigated by VistaGen Therapeutics for the treatment of generalized anxiety disorder (GAD) and post-traumatic stress disorder (PTSD). The pherine is a positional isomer of the endogenous pheromone androstadienol (5-androstadienol or 5,16-androstadien-3β-ol). As of 2020, it is in phase III clinical trials for social anxiety disorder.

Fasedienol lacks affinity for steroid hormone receptors and has instead been found to directly activate isolated human vomeronasal receptor cells at nanomolar concentrations (EC50 = 200nM).

The pheromone androstenol has been found to act as a potent positive allosteric modulator of the GABAA receptor, and it has been proposed that this action may mediate its pheromone effects. It produces anxiolytic-like effects in animals. Androstadienol, androstadienone, and androstenone, all of which are also pheromones, have been found to be converted into androstenol, and as such, it may be responsible for their pheromone effects. As fasedienol is very closely related structurally to androstadienol, it might be converted into androstenol similarly and hence potentiation of the GABAA receptor could contribute to its mechanism of action.

See also
 List of neurosteroids § Pheromones and pherines
 List of investigational anxiolytics

References

External links
 Product Pipeline - VistaGen Therapeutics
 PH 94B - AdisInsight

Androstanes
Anxiolytics
Pherines